Jeterboy Records was an American record label of the 1980s and 1990s, based in Broward County, Florida. It was part of the South Florida Punk and Hardcore scene, and released music by The Eat, Larry Joe Miller, D.T. Martyrs, Johnny Tonite, Stan Still Dance Band, Spanish Dogs, and other bands.

Releases

The Eat - Hialeah 7" EP 

Recorded at Sync Studios, Miami 1988–1992. Produced by the EAT. Engineered and Mixed by Hal Spector. Released 1995 on Jeterboy Records, original pressing 800 copies.

Tracks:
Hialeah
Shoes Shoes Shoes
M80 Ant Death
Psychotic McHale's Navy
Dream Of Yogi

The Eat - Scattered Wahoo Action (cassette) 

Jeterboy 002

Recorded at Sync Studios, 1982 and Music Labs, 1981, Catholic Love Recorded 1979 at a studio that nobody remembers the name of... Produced by the EAT and Charlie Pickett. Executive producer Kennedy. Compiled and edited by Joe Harris.

Released 1983 on Jeterboy Cassettes, original pressing 300 copies?
Re-released 1996 on 10" vinyl by Wicked Witch Records, pressing 1000 copies
Re-released 2003 on CD-R by Moss Music
Re-released 2008 on CD-R by Jeterboy/Lurch Records

Tracks:
Ballbusters On Parade
Open Man
She's Pissed Off
I Led Two Lives
Get Me High
Young Guy
Nixon's Binoculars
Mary Mary
The Car
Subhuman
Hey Jackass
Party Line
Living Like A Pig
Catholic Love #2 (studio version)

Various Artists - Jukebox (cassette) 

Jeterboy release 01

1983 compilation
contents:

The Eat—One Call To Cuba
Gay Cowboys In Bondage—X-Rated Go-Go Lunch
Radio berlin—In My Lifetime
Crank—Breaking The Law
The Cichlids—Motorboat
Stan Still Dance Band—Artist
The Eat—Nixon's Binoculars
Larry Joe Miller—Knocked-Out Joint On Mars
Jimmy J And Joe (Jimmy Johnson and Joe Imperato)--Lookin'
Charlie Pickett And The Eggs—Roosterin' With Intent (Live At The Button)
Spinouts—Shake Like A Hurricane
Poster Children—Grizzly Bear

D.T. Martyrs - Narcotics in the Carport (cassette) 

Released 1985, re-released on CD-R by Moss Music 2003

Recorded in February 1985 at T.A.M. Studios and L7 Studios. Engineered by Harmon and Bob Wlos.

On this recording, the Martyrs were Ian "Rusty" Hammond on guitar and vocals, Tony Bazemore on drums, Al Harmon on guitars and vocals, and Michael O'Brien on bass and vocals.

Tracks:
The Shape I'm In
Talk Trash
Scene Of The Crime
Born To Drink
Live To Drive
Narcotics In The Carport
Search My Car
Odds And Ends
Talking About (Heart And Soul)
Famous Veins
Last Ride
Come Together

Larry Joe Miller - Rub A Bucket (cassette) 

Jeterboy 003

Compiled and produced by Joe Harris. Recorded 1982–83. Tracks 1–7 recorded at Sync Studio, produced by Robert Mascaro. Tracks 8–10 "recorded mostly in living room, no production, lots a fun". Tracks 11–12 recorded at Rick Shaw Radio Show.

Musicians: Larry Joe Miller, Mad Dog Smith, Mark Pryor, Bobby "Boom-Boom" Gold, Bobby Tak, James Rowe, Jon Cecka, Jim Loy

Tracks:
Call Me Shorty
Young And Wild
Wild Boppin' Baby
Had It Up To Here
Long Legged Girl
Knocked Out Joint On Mars
Creature Feature
Kitty Kat Bop
Out 'N' Out
Class Dismissed
Rockabilly ('Till I'm Dead)
Gonna Rock Tonite

Ian Hammond And Sins Of Soul - Last Of The Martyrs LP 

Jeterboy 005

Released 1989. Produced by Ian Hammond, Tony Bazemore and Bob Wlos. Recorded At L7 Studio

Musicians: Ian Hammond, Tony Bazemore, Nick Kane, Otis Green, Mike Chatham, Rich Definis, Victor Frazier, Dave Cooke, Bob Wlos, Kevin MacIvor, Charlie Pickett

Note: According to Ian Hammond, Last Of The Martyrs started out as a DT Martyrs album featuring Ian, Tony Bazemore, Kevin MacIvor and Mike Chatham. Then as the album neared completion, Mike Chatham moved to NYC, and Kevin MacIvor was ousted in a power struggle. MacIvor's songs were dropped, and other musicians helped Hammond and Bazemore finish the album. Moss Music released a CD-R of the album as it might have originally been in 2003.

Tracks:
Railroad
Second Nature
Service Station
4 Barrel Blues
Made In The Shade
Play It By Ear
Day To Day
Miami Last Night
Hit My Stride

Johnny Tonite - The Savage Ones (cassette) 

Recorded at L7 Studios in Deerfield Beach, Florida. Produced by Pete Moss, Bob Wlos and Randy Ruffner. Engineered by Bob Wlos, Mike "Bongo God" Hawn and Pete Moss.

The Savage Ones was Johnny Tonight's first release. It sold out its first and only pressing. It was released in cassette form only in 1991. The Savage Ones has been re-released by Moss Records on CD.

Tracks:

You and Me
The Great Pretender
Needles Park
God Today
Saturday Night
Red Summer Rain
The Hour
Shake Down The House
One Turn
On The Hill
Watching My T.V.
All Over Now

Greg Baker reviewed The Savage Ones in April 1992. "And topping the list, out now from Jeterboy, a super slab (oh, okay, cassette) of American rock called The Savage Ones by Johnny Tonite. Starring local stalwarts Randy Ruffner and Pete Moss (with plenty of groovy guests), Johnny rocks true and right, no phony, manipulative, smoky-mirrors b.s. here, just simple rock songs beefed up by invention and raw sincerity transmitted by voice, guitar, bass, drums, hand claps, and incidentals. You need this album if only to hear "The Great Pretender," a majestic piece that might be the most infectious (in a good way) song released anywhere this year. The whole thing is pensive-angst munchable tasty, and I can't recommend it highly enough. Seek it out, dear rockers."

Johnny Tonite - Live Tonight 

Recorded at Sync Studios, Miami Beach. Produced by Frank "Rat Bastard" Falestra and Johnny Tonite. Engineered by Frank "Rat Bastard" Falestra and Pete Moss.

Tracks:

Suspicious Holiday
Madness
High School Books
Locomotive Breath
Almost Home

Live Tonight was released as a cassette only in 1993. It sold out in its one and only pressing. It has been recently re-released on a CD with The Savage Ones by Moss Records.

Johnny Tonite - Time of Arson 

Released in 1995.
Tracks:

Into The Car
Falling From Grace
It's Not So
One Good Cop
Come On People
Arcadia
Teenage Rock and Roll
Judy
Ain't That The Way
Fire In The Basement
Trailer Park Girl
Falling From Grace (acoustic version)
Word To Ya Mutha

Stan Still Dance Band - Midnight - 1985 

"Stan Still is also known as Randy Ruffner. Ruffner is also known as a former Spanish Dog. In fact, this is the Dogs without Kennedy. The music here is from the young and the restless, the angry and the punk. It's not hard core, but with titles like It's Alright To Die, it can be unrelenting. For those about to slam dance, this cassette salutes you."

The Squalor Sound/Various Artists - Obscurities (cassette)- 1985 

"This is another brainchild from Mike Kennedy. Kennedy advertised for songwriters who can't sing and singers who can't write and offered to do whichever part they could not. Then he would record and release the completed songs. This eight-song cassette is the result. It drones on a bit, but it's not bad. Included here are tunes by a furniture delivery man, a telephone operator, an art student and a housewife."

Spanish Dogs - Strange Bedfellows - 1985 

"The Dogs haven`t performed a concert since E. Clay Shaw was first elected to Congress, but Mike Kennedy and crew occasionally release a cassette to remind us how well the band combined poignant observation, social commentary and fun into a variety of styles. The band was loaded with strong and stubborn personalities that somehow managed to record well as a team. Four writers are credited among the 13 songs and at least three people take turns on lead vocals. Check out Don`t Turn Your Back, Rasta Man, Whimsical Days and No Strings."

References

External links 
 Joe Harris Interview
 Johnny Tonite
 The Pete Moss Memorial All Night Music Shoppe

American record labels